The Newport Harbor Light, also known as the Goat Island Light or Green Light, built in 1842, is located on north end of Goat Island, which is part of the city of Newport, Rhode Island, United States, in Narragansett Bay. The light was added to the National Register of Historic Places in 1988.

History
The first light on Goat Island was constructed in 1823-1824, but was later transported to Prudence Island in 1851, where the structure still remains as the Prudence Island Light.
The current light was constructed in 1842 a few yards off the coast of Goat Island, and was connected to Goat Island by a narrow dike (the area was filled in the 1960s for the hotel) because the previous light failed in adequately warning ships of a reef just a few yards off Goat Island.  The original lighting apparatus, however, was transferred to the newer lighthouse in 1842.

In 1864,an attached lighthouse keeper's house was built.  In 1921, a submarine hit the breakwater, damaging the foundation of the keeper's house. An electric light was placed in the tower the following year. The damaged keeper's dwelling was later torn down. 

After a private developer purchased Goat Island in the 1960s, the land between the northern end of Goat Island and the light was filled in to build a hotel. In 2000, the Coast Guard leased the light to the American Lighthouse Foundation; it is managed by the Friends of Newport Harbor Lighthouse.

Gallery

See also

National Register of Historic Places listings in Newport County, Rhode Island

References

External links

Lighthouses in Newport County, Rhode Island
Buildings and structures in Newport, Rhode Island
Narragansett Bay
Lighthouses completed in 1824
Lighthouses completed in 1842
Lighthouses completed in 1864
Houses completed in 1864
Lighthouses on the National Register of Historic Places in Rhode Island
National Register of Historic Places in Newport, Rhode Island
1824 establishments in Rhode Island
Tourist attractions in Newport, Rhode Island